Big Brother Angola is the Angolan version of the Big Brother reality television franchise produced by Endemol for DStv or M-Net Africa. The house is located in the same house as the houses of Big Brother Africa and Big Brother Mzansi, in South Africa. For the third season in 2016, the franchise also included Mozambique.

Series details

References

External links
 Official website

2014 television series debuts
2016 television series endings
2010s Angolan television series
Angola